This is a list of the National Register of Historic Places listings in Titus County, Texas.

This is intended to be a complete list of properties and districts listed on the National Register of Historic Places in Titus County, Texas. There is one property listed on the National Register in the county.

Current listings

The publicly disclosed locations of National Register properties may be seen in a mapping service provided.

|}

See also

National Register of Historic Places listings in Texas
Recorded Texas Historic Landmarks in Titus County

References

External links

Titus County, Texas
Titus County
Buildings and structures in Titus County, Texas